Aradoidea is a superfamily of true bugs. The Piesmatidae, usually placed in the Lygaeoidea, might also belong here.

References

 
Hemiptera superfamilies